is a Fukui Railway Fukubu Line railway station located in Sabae, Fukui Prefecture, Japan.

Lines

Station layout
The station consists of one ground-level side platform and one island platform connected by a level crossing. The station is staffed.

Adjacent stations

History
It was renamed  in April 1939. The station was renamed to its present name in June 1946.

Passenger statistics
In fiscal 2015, the station was used by an average of 667 passengers daily (boarding passengers only).

Surrounding area
 Shinmei Shrine
 "Shinmei-En" hot spring hotel

See also
 List of railway stations in Japan

References

External links

  

Railway stations in Fukui Prefecture
Railway stations in Japan opened in 1927
Fukui Railway Fukubu Line
Sabae, Fukui